Noam Chomsky  is a 1970 book by Sir John Lyons in which the author deals with the thoughts of Noam Chomsky.

Reception
The book was reviewed by G. Schelstraete, Dell Hymes and Abisoye Eleshin.

References

External links
Introduction to Theoretical Linguistics
1970 non-fiction books
Linguistics books
Works about Noam Chomsky
Viking Press books